Harder Stadium is a 17,000-seat, outdoor multi-purpose stadium on the west coast of the United States, on the campus of the University of California, Santa Barbara in Santa Barbara, California.  It serves as the on-campus soccer stadium for both the men's and women's programs.  Currently used occasionally by the university's club rugby and lacrosse teams, it was originally the home of the defunct football program.

History

The stadium was built  in 1966 and is named after Theodore "Spud" Harder, a former coach of the Gauchos' football team. The stadium hosted Vince Lombardi and the Green Bay Packers in January 1967 for their practices in the week ahead of the first Super Bowl.

The UCSB football team played their home games at Harder Stadium until football was cut after the 1971 season due to budget cuts.  UCSB brought football back as a non-scholarship sport in 1983 and by 1987 was playing a full Division II and III schedule.  In 1992, the NCAA ruled that Division I colleges must play at the Division I level in all sports; UCSB and a few other universities attempted to form a non-scholarship Division I-AAA level, but the effort failed and UCSB eventually dropped football.  The stadium has a capacity of 17,000, and currently is the largest stadium on California's central coast. Along with the UCSB Events Center, it is one of the more well-attended athletic venues in the central coast.

Harder Stadium hosted a memorial service for the victims of the 2014 Isla Vista Killings. Guests in attendance included UC President Janet Napolitano, and over 20,000 students, staff, alumni, and community members. The stadium seats were filled over capacity as thousands more sat on the grass field.

Soccer legacy

Harder Stadium sees most of its present-day use as a soccer stadium to the UCSB men's soccer and women's soccer teams. The stadium hosted the final three matches of the 2010 College Cup.  However, a number of professional club and international teams have played in Harder Stadium as well.

UC Santa Barbara teams
Due to the success of the men's program, the stadium has hosted numerous NCAA soccer playoff games in addition to the regular season games.  Despite the men's program recent success, it was the women's program who first brought the NCAA Tournaments to Harder Stadium.  The women hosted the first soccer NCAA Tournament game in a 1985 4-3 victory against Cal State Hayward.  In total, the women's program has held 4 NCAA Tournament matches at Harder Stadium, bringing such opponents as the Wisconsin Badgers, Stanford Cardinal, and Hartford Hawks.

The men's program hosted their first men's NCAA Tournament game in 2002, blanking the San Diego Toreros 2-0.  In total, they have hosted 9 NCAA Tournament games.

In 2004, 11,214 fans saw UCSB defeat VCU 4-1 to reach the College Cup (NCAA Soccer's "Final Four").  After the game, a group of students celebrated by carrying one of the soccer goals out of the stadium. They had planned to throw it into the Pacific Ocean (about 1/3 mile away), but were stopped by a combination of law enforcement down the block and tiring out from the weight of the goal.

However, in 2006, the UCSB won the 2006 Division I Men's College Cup in St. Louis, Missouri. Meanwhile, 2,000 miles away at Harder Stadium, a group of rowdy students marched down to the stadium from their homes and attempted the same feat. This time the group succeeded in their quest, throwing the soccer goal off of a cliff at the beginning of the 6600 block of Del Playa Drive.

In 2009, the NCAA awarded UCSB and Harder Stadium the 2010 Division I Men's College Cup, which is the "Final Four" of Division I men's soccer.

On September 24, 2010, the UCSB gaucho fans set a record on the highest attendance at any NCAA (on campus) soccer match. UCSB beat the visiting UCLA team (2-0) in front of 15,896 who attended the game.

Additional UCSB teams that use the stadium for select contests are the UCSB women's lacrosse, men's lacrosse and rugby teams. These teams are part of the UCSB Recreation Department and open to all students.

Other teams
Due to the large capacity of Harder Stadium, it is often used by professional teams exhibition games.  In 1991, the US Women's National Team played there before the 1991 FIFA Women's World Cup. Likewise, the US Men's National Team played there in 1994 against the Romanian National Team.

Club teams also have played at Harder Stadium. In March 2004, the San Jose Earthquakes and Los Angeles Galaxy played a pre-season exhibition in Santa Barbara. Following the success of MLS teams at Harder, in March 2006 & 2007, the UC Santa Barbara men's team played exhibition matches against the Columbus Crew while in July 2006, Cruz Azul and Los Angeles Galaxy played.  March 2007 also saw Shizuoka Sangyō University of Japan played off against UCSB.  March 2009 saw Club América and Monarcas Morelia played, while UCSB has scheduled to play the Mexican U-17 National Team.

Non-sporting activities
Every year, the school's Associated Students Program Board have thrown a free day-long party, known as EXTRAVAGANZA, at Harder Stadium.  Previous bands to have played at the festival include Fleetwood Mac, Sublime, No Doubt, Jack Johnson, T.I., Run-D.M.C., Coolio, Busta Rhymes, The Black Eyed Peas, Jane's Addiction, MxPx, Social Distortion, Eve 6, Pepper, Slightly Stoopid, Ludacris, Nas, Hellogoodbye, and E-40.

Harder Stadium also houses 18 art studios located beneath the seating risers. They are primarily used by graduate students and faculty.

References

External links
 Gaucho Locos' page on Harder Stadium
 UCSB athletics website

Defunct college football venues
College lacrosse venues in the United States
University of California, Santa Barbara buildings and structures
UC Santa Barbara Gauchos football
UC Santa Barbara Gauchos men's soccer
UC Santa Barbara Gauchos women's soccer
College soccer venues in California
American football venues in California
Lacrosse venues in California
Rugby union stadiums in California
Sports venues completed in 1966
1966 establishments in California